Eric Amevor (born 16 April 1938) is a Ghanaian middle-distance runner. He competed in the men's 1500 metres at the 1964 Summer Olympics.

References

External links

1938 births
Living people
Athletes (track and field) at the 1964 Summer Olympics
Ghanaian male middle-distance runners
Olympic athletes of Ghana
Place of birth missing (living people)